Copperville is an unincorporated community in Talbot County, Maryland, United States.

References

Unincorporated communities in Talbot County, Maryland
Unincorporated communities in Maryland